Junior M'Pia Mapuku (born 7 January 1990) is a Congolese footballer who plays as a forward for Bangladesh Premier League club Sheikh Russel KC.

Career
On 1 September 2016, Mapuku signed a contract with Turkish club Bandırmaspor, but ended up playing only two league games.

On 11 October 2016, Mapuku returned to Beroe Stara Zagora.

Levski Sofia
On 22 May 2017 he signed a 2-year contract with Levski Sofia, joining the team from the 2017–18 season. He soon claimed himself "The Black Power".
On his debut for the club, Mapuku scored 2 goals in an eventual 3–1 win against Sutjeska in the Europa League 1st qualifying round. In same match scored the quickest goal ever for Levski in European tournaments, finding the net after just 13 seconds. On 18 August 2017, Mapuku scored his debut goals in the league against Pirin Blagoevgrad, scoring a hattrick for the 3:0 win. It was the quickest hattrick scored by a foreigner in the club history after just 18 minutes (between the 74th and 92nd minute).

Shijiazhuang Ever Bright
After being deemed surplus to the requirements by Levski Sofia manager Delio Rossi, Mapuku signed a one-and-a-half year contract with Chinese club Shijiazhuang Ever Bright on 30 January 2018.

Al Shorta
In 2019 Mapuku joined Iraqi club Al-Shorta.

Slavia Sofia
In October 2021, Mapuku returned to Bulgaria, agreeing terms with Slavia Sofia for two seasons. However, he made only a few appearances for the team without managing to score and was released in February 2022 after falling out of favor with the manager Zlatomir Zagorčić.

Club statistics

Club

Honours

Club
Al-Shorta
 Iraqi Super Cup: 2019

References

External links
 
 Profile at Levskisofia.info

1990 births
Living people
Democratic Republic of the Congo footballers
Association football forwards
ES Troyes AC players
Sainte-Geneviève Sports players
Panachaiki F.C. players
AFC Compiègne players
PFC Beroe Stara Zagora players
PFC Levski Sofia players
Cangzhou Mighty Lions F.C. players
FC Dunărea Călărași players
Al-Shorta SC players
Al-Shoulla FC players
First Professional Football League (Bulgaria) players
China League One players
Liga I players
Saudi First Division League players
Expatriate footballers in Greece
Expatriate footballers in Bulgaria
Expatriate footballers in China
Expatriate footballers in Romania
Expatriate footballers in Iraq
Expatriate footballers in Saudi Arabia
Democratic Republic of the Congo expatriate sportspeople in Greece
Democratic Republic of the Congo expatriate sportspeople in Bulgaria
Democratic Republic of the Congo expatriate sportspeople in China
Democratic Republic of the Congo expatriate sportspeople in Romania
Democratic Republic of the Congo expatriate sportspeople in Saudi Arabia
21st-century Democratic Republic of the Congo people